The men's plain high diving was one of four diving events on the diving at the 1912 Summer Olympics programme. The competition was held on Saturday 6 July 1912, on Sunday 7 July 1912, and on Thursday 11 July 1912. Thirty-one divers from nine nations competed.

Results

The competition was actually held from both 10 metre and 5 metre platforms. Divers performed a total of five dives: a standing dive and two running dives from the 10 metre platform, and a standing dive and a running dive from the 5 metre platform. Five judges scored each diver, giving two results. Each judge gave an ordinal placing for each diver in a group, with the five scores being summed to give a total ordinal points score. The judges also gave scores more closely resembling the modern scoring system.

First round

The divers who scored the smallest number of points in each group of the first round plus the four best scoring non-qualified divers of all groups advanced to the final. Ordinal placings were used to rank divers within the group, but were not used to determine qualification.

Group 1

Group 2

Group 3

Group 4

Final

In the final, ordinal placings were the primary ranking method with dive scores being used only to break ties.

References

Sources
 
 

Men
1912
Men's events at the 1912 Summer Olympics